Andirá River is a river of Acre and Amazonas states in western Brazil. It is a tributary of the Acre River.

See also
List of rivers of Acre
List of rivers of Amazonas (Brazilian state)

References
Brazilian Ministry of Transport

Rivers of Acre (state)
Rivers of Amazonas (Brazilian state)